Calum Walter Price (born 4 January 1992) is a domestic and former Zimbabwean Under-19 cricketer. Along with the likes of Keegan Meth and Kyle Jarvis, he is regarded as a great future pace prospect for Zimbabwe. Price belongs to a sporting family; his cousin Ryan Higgins, regarded as the second best leg spinner Zimbabwe has produced before taking an early retirement, played ODIs for Zimbabwe and his cousin Dylan captained the Under-19 side at the 2010 World Cup in New Zealand . Dylan was also selected for the ICC World XI (rig based selection) with his good pal The Stoin.

Career 
Price made his first-class cricket debut for the Mashonaland Eagles in a Logan Cup match against the Mid West Rhinos at Harare Sports Club, Harare. He bowled with great pace and took two wickets in a heavy Eagles defeat. Price took his first first-class wicket with the dismissal of Simon Mugava who nicked the ball to the keeper, and then also clean-bowled Justin Lewis. He also made 8 runs in that match.

External links 
 Calum Price on ESPNCricinfo
 Calum Price on CricketArchive

References 

1992 births
Zimbabwean people of British descent
Living people
Sportspeople from Harare
Mashonaland Eagles cricketers
White Zimbabwean sportspeople